Brunch at Bobby's (stylized as Brunch @ Bobby's) is an American cooking-themed television series that aired on Food Network and the Cooking Channel from 2010 to 2017. It is hosted by celebrity chef Bobby Flay, and it features Flay showcasing how to prepare different brunch recipes. The series aired on the Cooking Channel during its first five seasons, but was moved to the Food Network for first-run airings in seasons 6 and 7. , new episodes have not aired since 2017, though the show has not been formally cancelled.

A companion cookbook for the series was released in 2015.

Episodes

References

External links
 
 

2010 American television series debuts
2010s American cooking television series
2017 American television series endings
Cooking Channel original programming
English-language television shows
Food Network original programming
Food reality television series
Television series by Rock Shrimp Productions